This is a list of the Imperial Knights of the Holy Roman Empire.

A
Auberge d'Allemagne
Auberge d'Allemagne, Birgu

F
Frankenstein Castle

K
Knights of the Golden Spur

O
Order of the Golden Fleece

R
Rhön-Werra

T
Teutonic Order

References

Knights
 List